Alexandra "Xan" Cassavetes is an American actress and director. She is the daughter of Greek-American actor-director John Cassavetes and actress Gena Rowlands. She is the granddaughter of actress Katherine Cassavetes. She is the sister of actor-director Nick Cassavetes and actor-screenwriter-director Zoe Cassavetes.

Cassavetes directed the 2004 documentary Z Channel: A Magnificent Obsession, which explores the historic influence of the cable television station Z Channel. The film won acclaim, and screened out of competition at the Cannes Film Festival. In 2012, Cassavetes wrote and directed her first dramatic feature, the vampire tale Kiss of the Damned.

Filmography
Actress 

Writer and director

References

External links
 Z Channel official website
 
 Alexandra Cassavetes – la Repubblica.it

Living people
21st-century American actresses
21st-century American screenwriters
21st-century American women writers
Actresses from Los Angeles
American people of Aromanian descent
American people of Irish descent
American people of Welsh descent
American women film directors
American women screenwriters
American writers of Greek descent
Alexandra
Film directors from Los Angeles
Screenwriters from California
Writers from Los Angeles
Year of birth missing (living people)